William Mendieta (born 9 January 1989) is a Paraguayan international footballer who plays for Club Libertad as an attacking midfielder or winger.

Club career
Born in Asunción, Mendieta has played for Libertad, Rubio Ñu and Sol de América.

In 2013, Mendieta completed a transfer to Palmeiras for around U$$2 Million.

International career
Mendieta made his international debut for Paraguay in 2012.

Honours 
Palmeiras
Campeonato Brasileiro Série B: 2013

External links
 
 
 William Mendieta at playmakerstats.com (English version of ceroacero.es)

1989 births
Living people
Paraguayan footballers
Paraguayan expatriate footballers
Paraguay international footballers
Association football midfielders
Club Libertad footballers
Sociedade Esportiva Palmeiras players
Club Rubio Ñu footballers
Club Sol de América footballers
Club Olimpia footballers
FC Juárez footballers
Paraguayan Primera División players
Campeonato Brasileiro Série B players
Liga MX players
Paraguayan expatriate sportspeople in Brazil
Paraguayan expatriate sportspeople in Mexico
Expatriate footballers in Brazil
Expatriate footballers in Mexico